Moratuwa Sports Club was a first-class cricket team in Sri Lanka. It competed in the Premier Trophy, Sri Lanka's main first-class cricket competition, for 13 of the seasons following the international recognition of first-class status for the 1988–89 season, although its first-class status was not continuous. In addition, it competed in the Premier Limited Overs Tournament, Sri Lanka's main List A cricket competition, for five seasons.

Status in different cricket seasons
Moratuwa's matches in the Premier Trophy are considered by international cricket authorities as having been of first-class status in the seasons 1988–1991, 1992–1996, 2001–2004 and 2007–2010. Its games in the Premier Limited Overs Tournament are similarly considered to be of List A status in the seasons 1993–94, 2002–03 and 2007–2010.

It has not competed at either first-class or List A status since 2010.

Notable people
 

Kamilas Perera

See also
 List of Sri Lankan cricket teams

References

External links
 Moratuwa Cricket Club at CricketArchive

Former senior cricket clubs of Sri Lanka